USNS Trenton (JHSV-5/T-EPF-5), (ex-Resolute) is the fifth , operated by the United States Navys Military Sealift Command. Spearhead-class ships are used to support overseas operations, conduct humanitarian aid and disaster relief, and support special operations forces. This type of vessel also has an aviation flight deck and can operate in shallow waters.

Construction and career 
Trenton completed acceptance trials on 13 March 2015 and was delivered to the United States Navy on 13 April 2015.

June 2018 rescue 
On 12 June 2018, Trenton rescued 40 migrants from a dinghy in the Mediterranean Sea off the coast of Libya. Twelve people died before they could be picked up. When Trenton, along with non-governmental organization (NGO) search and rescue (SAR) ships, sought a debarkation port, Trenton was initially unable to find a port willing to accept the migrants because Italy and Malta were engaged in a dispute about the acceptance of migrants. The private NGO ship Sea Watch III denied Trentons request to transfer the migrants, fearing to share the fate of the NGO ship , which had been turned away by Italy and Malta two days earlier on 10 June and had to travel to Spain instead.
Trenton was spotted waiting for orders off the port of Augusta, Sicily, on 15 June. The 41 individuals were finally accepted by Italy and were handed over to the Italian Coast Guard vessel Diciotti on 17 June at Lampedusa.

References

External links

 

2014 ships
Spearhead-class Joint High Speed Vessels
Ships of the United States Navy